In 2022, the Pakistani political crises began when the opposition joined hands and submitted a no-confidence motion against Imran Khan's government in the National Assembly, which was followed by Political crises in the country, on national as well as provincial level. PTI's Usman Buzdar, the Chief Minister of Punjab province resigned from his post on Khan's order in favour of Pervaiz Elahi, PTI's ally, which led to a political crisis in Punjab Assembly. A no-confidence motion against the Khyber Pakhtunkhwa Chief Minister Mahmood Khan was also filed by the opposition parties in the Khyber Pakhtunkhwa Assembly while the Pakistan Tehreek-e-Insaf (PTI) submitted a motion of no-confidence against their own Azad Kashmir prime minister.

PDM protests

No-confidence motion against Imran Khan
A no-confidence motion was tabled against PM Imran Khan on the 28th of March 2022. This was followed by a slow trickle of allies going from the Pakistan Tehreek-e-Insaf (PTI) led government to the Pakistan Muslim League (N) (PML-N) led opposition. First came independent members and the Jamhoori Watan Party, followed by the Balochistan Awami Party (BAP) and defectors from the Pakistan Muslim League (Q) (PML-Q). However, the final death blow to the ruling coalition was the defection of the Muttahida Qaumi Movement – Pakistan. The opposition also claimed it had the support from a group of PTI MNAs led by ex-secretary general of the PTI, Jahangir Tareen. The PTI alleged that this was in violation of article 63(a) of the Pakistani constitution. The voting was scheduled to take place on 3 April. However, the deputy speaker, Qasim Suri, refused to hold the vote, citing a foreign conspiracy against the government, and article 5 of the constitution. This was later ruled unconstitutional by the Supreme Court. Voting finally took place on 9 April, with Imran Khan losing the vote. Shehbaz Sharif was elected Prime Minister of Pakistan two days later, on the 11th of April.

Provincial Assembly of the Punjab crisis
After years of political pressure, the Chief Minister Usman Buzdar resigned. The resignation was accepted by the governor on the 1st of April 2022. The current speaker, Chaudhry Pervaiz Elahi, a member of the PML(Q), was nominated by the PML(Q) and PTI for the role of chief minister, while the opposition parties, PML-N and PPP nominated Hamza Shehbaz of the PML(N). Due to the speaker being a contestant in the election, the deputy speaker, Dost Muhammad Mazari of the PTI was in charge of the proceedings. The election, originally scheduled for the 16th of April was moved ahead to the 6th of April by the deputy speaker. However, the secretary assembly refused to comply with his orders, and a no-confidence motion was moved against him by his own party.

Constitutional crisis
On the 3rd of April 2022, Deputy Speaker Qasim Suri refused to hold a vote of no confidence against the Prime Minister Imran Khan, citing article 5 of the Pakistani Constitution, and then proceeded to dissolve the National Assembly. He and the Prime Minister, along with other members of the ruling PTI, alleged a foreign conspiracy against them, with no evidence brought forth thus far. The Supreme Court took on the case suo moto and ruled 5-0 that the ruling was unconstitutional and the vote needed to take place on the 9th of April 2022

Khyber Pakhtunkhwa Assembly
On April 8, opposition parties in the Khyber Pakhtunkhwa Assembly filed a no-confidence motion against Khyber Pakhtunkhwa Chief Minister Mahmood Khan. The no-confidence motion was filed by Awami National Party parliamentary leader Sardar Hussain Babak, provincial senior vice president Khush Dil Khan, MPA Shagufta Malik and others from the united opposition in the provincial assembly secretariat. The no-confidence motion has the signatures of more than 20 members.

No-confidence motion against Azad Kashmir prime minister
On 12 April 2022, PTI submitted a motion of no-confidence against their own Azad Kashmir prime minister.

Oath crises

National Assembly
When PML-N leader Shahbaz Sharif was elected Prime Minister, President Arif Alvi had to take oath from him. However, the president went on leave due to illness. In his absence, Senate Chairman Sadiq Sanjrani administered the oath of office to the new Prime Minister.

On April 19, 2022, Prime Minister Shahbaz Sharif's 34-member cabinet was sworn in, but President Arif Alvi refused again.

Punjab Assembly
An extraordinary session of the Punjab Assembly was held on 16 April 2022, in which the opposition candidate Hamza Shahbaz was elected the new Chief Minister but he has not been able to take the oath of office yet which has created a situation of uncertainty. Governor Punjab Omar Sarfaraz Cheema refuses to take oath from newly elected Chief Minister Hamza Shahbaz.

Azadi March I
The 2022 Azadi March I (Urdu: آزادی مارچ, romanized: Āzādī Mārch, lit. 'Freedom March') was a protest march initiated by the ousted former Pakistani prime minister and Pakistan Tehreek-e-Insaf party chairman Imran Khan against the government of his successor, Prime Minister Shehbaz Sharif. On 24 May 2022, Khan announced a long march towards Islamabad starting on 25 May 2022.[2] Khan lead the march from Peshawar, the capital of Khyber Pakhtunkhwa, where his provincial government helped him. Senior PTI members lead the march from Lahore, the capital of Punjab.

Azadi March II
The 2022-23 Azadi March II (Urdu: حقیقی آزادی مارچ, romanized: Haqiqi Azadi March) is a protest march sequel of the 2022 Azadi March I led by the former Prime Minister of Pakistan Imran Khan from Lahore to Islamabad against the Shehbaz Sharif ministry's refusal to announce early general elections and the appointment of a new Pakistan Army Chief.[14]

Imran ultimately announced on 25 October 2022, that the long march will begin on 28 October, from Liberty Chowk, Lahore, and will end in Islamabad before turning into a sit-in.[15][16][17]

Imran Khan Assassination Attempt

On the date of November 3rd, 2022 former prime minister of Pakistan Imran Khan was engaged in an assassination attempt. This attempt from the gunmen on the streets did not go their way. As Imran Khan survived the shooting during a political rally he pursued. The march to the Capital as it was called was an important rally for Khan’s political comeback as he is trying to undo the wrong choice of his own country’s politicians when they removed him from office. From this attack near the town of Gujranwala, Imran Khan was shot in the leg where a senior leader Asad Umar states the following “Yes, he has been shot, there are pellets lodged in his leg, his bone has been chipped, he has also been shot in his thigh.

Imran Khan Conspiracy Concerns Against U.S.A

The United States has complicated ties with the South Asian nation. Former prime minister Imran Khan during an exclusive interview with CNN’s Becky Andersen is claiming that Donald Lu, who is an assistant secretary of the US Bureau of South and Central Asian Affairs insists that Imran Khan should be removed from office. As the sheer presence of Imran Khan in Pakistan is making the US’s ties with India and Afghanistan difficult. Khan has indicated to CNN that Lu has made serious allegations that if Khan is not removed this will lead to “serious consequences for Pakistan” 

Furthermore, a US State Department spokesperson has insisted to CNN that these rumors from Khan are full of nonsense.

References

2022 in Pakistani politics
March 2022 events in Pakistan
April 2022 events in Pakistan
Pakistan
Political crises